Fahd bin Saud Al Saud ( Fahd bin Su'ūd Āl Su'ūd; 1923 – 30 October 2006) was a Saudi Arabian businessman, government official, and the eldest son of King Saud. He served as the Saudi Arabian minister of defense from 1956 to 1960 during the reign of his father.

Early life

Prince Fahd was born in 1923 as the first son of the future King Saud. His mother was Munirah bint Saad bin Saud Al Saud, granddaughter of Saud bin Faisal bin Turki, who was the brother of Abdul Rahman bin Faisal, grandfather of King Saud. Thus, Prince Fahd's parents were second cousins.

Career
During the reign of his father, Prince Fahd was first made the head of the royal court which he held between 1953 and 1956. Next he was appointed the minister of defense and inspector general in 1956 replacing Mishaal bin Abdulaziz Al Saud in the post. He left the office, but reassumed the post on 26 September 1958 and remained in office until 1960. He was the Saudi ambassador to Greece from 1964 to 1968.

After retiring from government Prince Fahd involved in business.

Personal life
Prince Fahd had two wives. One of his spouses was Princess Al Anoud, a daughter of King Faisal. King Abdulaziz arranged their marriage to reduce the tension between their fathers. They married in May 1943, but separated after years of marriage. His second wife was of Syrian origin. He had one daughter: Amal bint Fahad.

Death and burial
On 30 October 2006, Prince Fahd died at his house and was buried at Al Adl cemetery in Mecca.

References

External links

Fahd
Fahd
1923 births
2006 deaths
Fahd
Fahd
Fahd
Fahd